Indian Mills, formerly known as Brotherton, is an unincorporated community located within Shamong Township in Burlington County, New Jersey, United States. It was the site of Brotherton Indian Reservation, the only Indian reservation in New Jersey and the first in America, founded for the Lenni Lenape tribe, some of whom were native to New Jersey's Washington Valley.

Before becoming a reservation, it was an industrial town, known for gristmills and sawmills. Brotherton was the first Native American reservation in New Jersey.

The town was also historically known as Edgepillock or Edgepelick.

History 
In 1756, the British colonial government appointed commissioners to resolve disputes between white settlers and the Munsee Lenape native to the Washington Valley. For 100 years prior, the groups had been on peaceful terms.

In 1757, the "New Jersey Association for Helping the Indians" wrote a constitution to expel Munsee Lenape native to the Washington Valley. Led by Reverend John Brainerd, colonists forcefully relocated 200 people to Indian Mills, then known as Brotherton.

In 1777, Reverend John Brainerd abandoned the reservation, making circumstances increasingly difficult.

In 1780, Munsee Lenape community leaders of Brotherton, native to Washington Valley, wrote a community treaty to oppose selling any more land to white settlers:

Displacement to Stockbridge, New York 
In 1796, the Oneidas of Stockbridge invited Brotherton's Lenape families to join their reservation. The initial Lenape response was negative; in 1798, Munsee Lenape community leaders Bartholomew Calvin, Jason Skekit, and 18 others signed a public statement of refusal to leave "our fine place in Jersey."

However, in 1801, many of the Munsee Lenape families agreed to relocate to New Stockbridge, New York to join the Oneidas. A few Munsee Lenapes stayed behind and assimilated with the white colonists.

Displacement to Green Bay, Wisconsin 
In 1822, the remaining families were forcefully displaced over 900 miles' travel away to Green Bay, Wisconsin.

References

Shamong Township, New Jersey
Unincorporated communities in Burlington County, New Jersey
Unincorporated communities in New Jersey
Former American Indian reservations
Native American history of New Jersey